ATP (formally, the Agreement on the International Carriage of Perishable Foodstuffs and on the Special Equipment to be used for such Carriage (ATP)) is a 1970 United Nations treaty that establishes standards for the international transport of perishable food between the states that ratify the treaty. It has been updated through amendment a number of times and as of 2016 has 50 state parties, most of which are in Europe or Central Asia. It is open to ratification by states that are members of the United Nations Economic Commission for Europe (UNECE) and states that otherwise participate in UNECE activities. "ATP" is derived from the French name of the treaty: Accord relatif aux transports internationaux de denrées périssables et aux engins spéciaux à utiliser pour ces transports.

ATP was concluded in Geneva on 1 September 1970 under the aegis of the UNECE. It was signed by Austria, West Germany, Italy, Luxembourg, Netherlands, Portugal, and Switzerland. The treaty entered into force on 21 November 1976 after it had been ratified by five states. ATP was intended to replace the Agreement on Special Equipment for the Transport of Perishable Foodstuffs and on the Use of such Equipment for the International Transport of some of those Foodstuffs, which was concluded in 1962 but never received enough ratifications to enter into force.

ATP mandates that certain types of equipment be used to transport perishable food across borders and that such equipment will be regularly inspected. (For instance, equipment may need to be refrigerated, heated, or insulated.) ATP applies to transport by road and by rail, but it does not apply to transport within the borders of a single country.

As of 2016, the following 50 states are party to ATP:

Former state parties are Czechoslovakia, East Germany, and Yugoslavia. Russia ratified as the Soviet Union and Serbia ratified as the Federal Republic of Yugoslavia. Switzerland signed the agreement but has not ratified it.

Notes

External links
Text of original 1970 treaty
Text of amended treaty as of 23 September 2013
Signatures and ratifications 
2016 ATP Handbook
ATP testing stations and competent national authorities

1970 in Switzerland
Food safety
Food treaties
Transport treaties
Treaties concluded in 1970
Treaties entered into force in 1976
Treaties of Albania
Treaties of Andorra
Treaties of Austria
Treaties of Azerbaijan
Treaties of Belarus
Treaties of Belgium
Treaties of Bosnia and Herzegovina
Treaties of the People's Republic of Bulgaria
Treaties of Croatia
Treaties of the Czech Republic
Treaties of Czechoslovakia
Treaties of Denmark
Treaties of Estonia
Treaties of Finland
Treaties of France
Treaties of Georgia (country)
Treaties of West Germany
Treaties of East Germany
Treaties of Greece
Treaties of the Hungarian People's Republic
Treaties of Ireland
Treaties of Italy
Treaties of Kazakhstan
Treaties of Kyrgyzstan
Treaties of Latvia
Treaties of Lithuania
Treaties of Luxembourg
Treaties of Monaco
Treaties of Montenegro
Treaties of Morocco
Treaties of the Netherlands
Treaties of Norway
Treaties of the Polish People's Republic
Treaties of Portugal
Treaties of Moldova
Treaties of Romania
Treaties of the Soviet Union
Treaties of San Marino
Treaties of Saudi Arabia
Treaties of Serbia and Montenegro
Treaties of Slovakia
Treaties of Slovenia
Treaties of Francoist Spain
Treaties of Sweden
Treaties of Tajikistan
Treaties of North Macedonia
Treaties of Tunisia
Treaties of Turkey
Treaties of Ukraine
Treaties of the United Kingdom
Treaties of the United States
Treaties of Uzbekistan
Treaties of Yugoslavia
United Nations Economic Commission for Europe treaties
Treaties extended to the Faroe Islands
Treaties extended to Greenland
1970 in transport